Hans  Joachim Specht (born 6 June 1936) is a German experimental particle and nuclear physicist and university professor at the Heidelberg University.

Biography 
Born in Unna, Specht attended the Gymnasium in Kamen and studied physics from 1956 until 1962 at the Ludwig Maximilian University of Munich, the Technical University of Munich and the ETH Zurich. He received his diploma in 1962 at the TU Muenchen, followed by his doctorate summa cum laude in 1964 with Heinz Maier-Leibnitz on the basis of experiments at the Forschungsreaktor Muenchen (FRM). As a postdoc he had a NRC Fellowship at the AECL Nuclear Physics Laboratories in Chalk River in Canada. Starting in 1969 he was assistant at the LMU, made his habilitation in 1970 and became associate professor. He experimented there both at the FRM and the joint accelerator of the LMU and the TU Muenchen.

In 1973 Specht became full professor at the Heidelberg University.

He did research at the Max Planck Institute for Nuclear Physics in Heidelberg, GSI Helmholtz Centre for Heavy Ion Research and at CERN. He was a member of the experiment R807/808 at the Intersecting Storage Rings (ISR), spokesperson of NA34-2/HELIOS and of NA45/CERES, and since 2003 member of NA60 at the Super Proton Synchrotron (SPS). From 1992 until 1999 he was Scientific Director of GSI in Darmstadt. Here he initiated the tumor therapy with heavy ions and patient treatments on the grounds of the laboratory itself, in collaboration with the Radiology Clinic of the University and the German Cancer Research Center in Heidelberg. This paved the way to the clinic facility HIT in Heidelberg. In 2004 he became professor emeritus.

Research 
His central research areas were atomic physics (quasi-molecules in low-energy heavy-ion collisions), nuclear fission (shape isomers and fission induced by heavy ions), and quark-gluon plasma formation in high-energy heavy-ion collisions at CERN., In each 1983/84, 1990/91 and 2003/2004 he spent a sabbatical year at CERN. In 1996 he was Chairman of the International Conference on Quark Matter in Heidelberg.

He also worked together with Hans Guenter Dosch and others on the physics and  neurophysiology of the early processing of central musical quantities in the brain, like tone pitch and tone spectrum (he plays piano since childhood).

Since 2000 he is a member of  the Heidelberg Academy of Sciences and Humanities. He was Loeb Lecturer at Harvard University in 1999. In the same year he got the Werner-Heisenberg-Medaille of the Alexander von Humboldt Foundation.

Publications 
 Reaktionen zwischen schweren Atomkernen – gegenwärtige und künftige Entwicklungen. Physikalische Blätter, Vol. 37, 1981, no. 7, p. 199 (Online).
 Gute Physik mit vorhandenen Geräten machen. Physikalische Blätter, Vol. 49, 1993, p. 46–48 (Online).
 Nuclear Fission. Rev. Mod. Phys. 46, 1974, p. 773-787 (Online).
 Spectroscopic Properties of Fission Isomers., with V. Metag et al., Phys. Reports 65, 1980, p. 1-41 (Online).
 NA60: In Hot Pursuit of Thermal Dileptons., with S. Damjanovic and R. Shahoyan, CERN Courier 11/2009, p. 31-34 (Online).

References

External links 
 Homepage
 Article in "Heidelberger Physiker berichten - Rückblicke auf Forschung in der Physik und Astronomie, Band 3: Mikrokosmos und Makrokosmos", 
 Heavy-ion physics and the SPS: a long way together  (2016)
 Heidelberg University: Fest Colloquium on the occasion of Hans Joachim Specht's 80th birthday

20th-century German physicists
1936 births
Academic staff of the Ludwig Maximilian University of Munich
German nuclear physicists
Academic staff of Heidelberg University
21st-century German  physicists
Living people
People associated with CERN